Vĩnh Thạnh is a township and capital of Vĩnh Thạnh District, Cần Thơ, Vietnam.

References

Populated places in Cần Thơ
District capitals in Vietnam
Townships in Vietnam